Speaking of Now is the tenth studio album by the Pat Metheny Group. It was released in 2002 by Warner Bros. In 2003 the group was awarded the Grammy Award for Best Contemporary Jazz Album.

Speaking of Now marks the first appearances of drummer Antonio Sánchez and multi-instrumentalist Cuong Vu as members of Metheny's band. Cameroonian musician Richard Bona also participated in the album's recording and tour, the latter of which particularly showcased his abilities on vocals and bass guitar.

In 2003, as part of the album's promotion, a concert was recorded in Japan and released on DVD and the Group performed on the PBS series Austin City Limits.

Track listing

There is an unnamed hidden track after track 5 that is a prelude to track 6. It has a duration of 28 seconds and some CD players will display a countdown from minus 28 to 0 seconds as it plays. To arrive at the track times listed above, which are taken from the liner notes, the actual track times are modified using the time of the hidden track and several seconds of gap time by subtracting from track 5 and adding to track 6.

The total time listed in the liner notes is 71:10. However, the actual sum of the track times listed in the liner notes is 71:30.

The actual total time is 72:05 as displayed on most CD players and computer media players. This includes the time of the gaps between tracks.

Track 10 appears on the Japanese release only.

Personnel
 Pat Metheny – acoustic and electric guitars, guitar synthesizer
 Lyle Mays – piano, keyboards
 Steve Rodby – double bass, cello
 Richard Bona – vocals, percussion, acoustic guitar, fretless bass
 Cuong Vu – trumpet, vocals
 Antonio Sánchez – drums
Additional musicians
 Dave Samuels – percussion, marimba

Awards
Grammy Awards

Video

Personnel
Recorded live during the Speaking of Now World Tour, September 19–20, 2002 NHK Hall, Tokyo, Japan
Directed by Takayuki Watanabe 
Produced by Pat Metheny and Steve Rodby
Executive producers – Ted Kurland and David Sholemson
Recorded by Pete Karam and David Oakes
Mixed by Rob Eaton

References

Pat Metheny albums
2002 albums
Warner Records albums
Grammy Award for Best Contemporary Jazz Album